The Committee of Concerned Scientists (CCS) is an independent international organization devoted to the protection and advancement of human rights and scientific freedom of scientists, physicians, engineers, and scholars.

History
The Committee was formed in 1972 in Washington and New York as an ad hoc group of scientists and scholars concerned about violations of academic freedom and persecution of scientists around the world. (Sometimes the creation of the Committee is dated to 1973.)

Most of the activities of the Committee in the 1970s and 1980s were aimed to help refuseniks and dissident  scholars in the Soviet Union and Soviet bloc countries.

The Committee lobbied both the Soviet and western governments on behalf of these oppressed scholars, provided moral and financial support to them and organized conferences and meetings of refuseniks, including in the Soviet Union itself. Sometimes the Concerned Scientists Committee is credited with having coined the actual term "refusenik".  The Committee played an active role in helping such Soviet dissidents as Andrei Sakharov, Natan Sharansky, Yuri Orlov, Benjamin Levich, and others.

Subsequently, CCS expanded its activities to pursue human rights and academic freedom issues in other countries. For example, CCS lobbied both the Chinese and the U.S. governments on behalf of the Chinese astrophysicist Fang Lizhi, who supported dissident students during the 1989 Tiananmen Square massacre. After his immigration to the U.S., Fang Lizhi served on the CCS himself. In 2001 the CCS lobbied the Russian government and the Russian President Vladimir Putin in support of the Russian scientist Igor Sutyagin, who was accused by the FSB (the successor agency to the KGB) of treason and espionage. In 2016, CCS made an appeal to then-Chilean President Michelle Bachelet to reopen the case of Boris Weisfeiler, a mathematician who disappeared in Chile in 1985. In 2019, CCS made the case to Donald Trump, then U.S. President, to end a described campaign to intimidate U.S. scientists of Chinese ethnicity.

Activities
The Committee issues an annual report about cases of abuse of academic freedom and human rights of scientists and scholars around the world.

Members 
Prominent scientists who served on the CCS include a substantial number of Nobel Prize winners, such as Paul Flory, Gerhard Herzberg, David Baltimore, Owen Chamberlain, Jerome Karle, Walter Kohn, John Charles Polanyi, Charles Hard Townes, Steven Weinberg, Rosalyn Sussman Yalow, and others.

Mathematical physicist Joel Lebowitz has been the long-term co-chair of the CCS.  Sophie Cook, a retired government lawyer and mediator, has served as executive director from 2008 to 2015, dividing her time between New York City and Washington, D.C. Her successor and current executive director is Carol Susan Valoris.

See also 

 Scholars at Risk
 Council for At-Risk Academics (CARA)

References

External links
The Committee of Concerned Scientists website
Committee of Concerned Scientists, records, 1970-2006. Columbia University Libraries, Archival Collections.

Human rights organizations based in the United States
Scientific organizations based in the United States